JobServe Ltd is a private company headquartered in Tiptree, Essex, United Kingdom, which runs an employment website, job adverts being placed on the site on behalf of employers and employment agencies.  It is part of the Aspire Media Group Ltd.

History

Founded by Robbie Cowling, an Information Technology (IT) contractor and his business partner John Witney, it was originally incorporated as Fax-Me-Limited in 1993 and later changing its name to JobServe Ltd. in 1995.

The company says the concept arose as the United Kingdom was rising out of recession in the 1990s and a problem area was identified with the IT workforce attempting to inefficiently find jobs through advertisements in recruitment magazines which would frequently turn out to be out of date.  The company says it sought to address this on 4 May 1994 by the launch of a jobs-by-email service to send a daily and up to date list of targeted positions to job seekers.  The company says it first created its website presence later in 1994 and it also claims this was the world's first recruitment website.

By 2001 it had become a dominant force in the market with observers being of the opinion it controlled up to 80% of the IT recruitment market.  This had led to litigation when it refused to accept advertisements from agencies associated with rival companies.

In 2003 Jobserve became the first dot.com company to be selected for the Queen's Awards for Enterprise.  The year also saw Cowling buy out Witney with Jobserve moving into £1 million new premises in Tiptree.

By 2006 Jobserve was covering not only the IT sector but was covering 17 industry sectors in total.

JobServe is currently managed by its co-founder Robbie Cowling and USA division, Richard Padgett.   the company claims jobs-by-email still remained significant with a claim of 1.2 million job subscription emails being sent per day.

Locations and partners 
JobServe currently has its UK base Colchester in the United Kingdom.

A holding company, Jobserve Holdings Limited, was established in the year 2000 and renamed Aspire Media Limited in December 2008.

Jobserve and its parent, Aspire Media Group, has partnerships with a number of other brands.

It launched in Australia in 2002 with a base in Sydney..  In the United States of America there are offices in (North Carolina & Ohio)

Football
The company has had involvements with local team Colchester United F.C. and was the shirt sponsor of Premier League club West Ham United F.C. between 2003–04 and 2006-07 seasons  In 2018 Jobserve won a competitive tender for the right for the Colchester Community Stadium to be named the Jobserve Community Stadium.

Notes

References

Sources

Further reading
 Big day for job hunters as JobServe Live hits down (From Daily Echo) 
 Tiptree, Great Totham: 'I'm a dot.com millionaire!' (From Brentwood Weekly News)

External links

 

Employment websites
1993 establishments in the United Kingdom
Business services companies established in 1993
Employment in the United Kingdom